Tatyana Ivanovna Stetsenko, later Bunyak (born 7 February 1957) is a Soviet rower.

Stetsenko was born in Plesetske, Kiev. She won a silver medal at the 1980 Moscow Olympics with the women's eight.

References

External links
 

1957 births
Living people
Ukrainian female rowers
Soviet female rowers
Rowers at the 1980 Summer Olympics
Olympic silver medalists for the Soviet Union
Olympic rowers of the Soviet Union
Olympic medalists in rowing
Medalists at the 1980 Summer Olympics
World Rowing Championships medalists for the Soviet Union
Sportspeople from Kyiv Oblast